Atmosphere is a monthly peer-reviewed open access scientific journal covering research related to the Earth's atmosphere. The journal is published by MDPI and was established in 2010. The founding editor-in-chief was Daniela Jacob (Max Planck Institute for Meteorology) until 2014. She was succeeded by Robert Talbot (University of Houston) and then Allison C. Aiken (Los Alamos National Laboratory).

Abstracting and indexing
The journal is abstracted and indexed in:

According to the Journal Citation Reports, the journal has a 2020 impact factor of 2.686.

References

External links

English-language journals
Monthly journals
Open access journals
Publications established in 2010
MDPI academic journals